Metal is Forever – The Very Best of Primal Fear, is the first best-of album released by the German power metal group Primal Fear.

Track listing 

Bonus CD "Metal Classics": classic cover songs, only in the European edition.

Personal
Ralf Scheepers - vocals
Henny Wolter - guitars
Tom Naumann - guitar
Stefan Leibing - guitar, keyboards
Mat Sinner - bass guitar, vocals
Randy Black - drums
Klaus Sperling - drums

Production
Stephan Lohrmann - cover art
Mat Sinner - producer
Achim Köhler - engineering, mixing, remastering at Indiscreet Studios, Germany
Charlie Bauerfeind - engineering, mixing
Mike Frazer - engineering, mixing

Primal Fear (band) albums
2007 greatest hits albums
Covers albums
Nuclear Blast compilation albums